HMS Avenger was the collier Thames, launched in 1803, that the Royal Navy purchased in 1804 and renamed. During her service she captured a number of prizes. She also captured one French privateer and participated in the capture of the Danish island of Anholt. She wrecked at St Johns Newfoundland on 8 October 1812.

Royal Navy
Commander Thomas white commissioned Avenger in June 1804 for the North Sea. On 14 April 1806 Avenger sailed for Newfoundland.

On 17 December 1806 Avenger destroyed the French privateer cutter Hazard. The encounter occurred in the Channel. Hazard, of 16 guns, had mistaken Avenger for a merchantman (which she had been), and ran into Avenger to board. Hazard sank before British or French boats could be gotten out, taking with her 46 men of her crew of 50; two British sailors also died in the encounter. Hazard was a cutter, eight days out of Morlaix. She had not captured anything. Her captain and five men were saved.

Avenger served on the Halifax, Nova Scotia station in 1807.

On 3 May 1808 Avenger sailed for Newfoundland. Between February and April 1809 she was at Plymouth, undergoing fitting for service in the Baltic.

A party of seamen and marines under the command of Captain William Selby of Owen Glendower, with the assistance of Captain Edward Nicolls of the Standards marines, landed. The Danish garrison of 170 men put up a sharp but ineffectual resistance that killed one marine and wounded two; the garrison then capitulated. The British took immediate possession of the island. Hollis stated that Anholt was important as a source of water to the Navy, and as a good anchorage for merchant vessels going to or coming from the Baltic.

Avenger captured a Danish boat on 29 May 1809. Then on 9 August Avenger captured 
Driftrigheden, Ebenetzer, and Schooner No.8. On 17 October Avenger captured Three Sisters, Christian and Margarethe, Norsamheid, Carin Catherina, and Die Keine Hoffnung.

On 11 May 1810 Avenger sailed again for Newfoundland.

Commander White was promoted to post captain on 7 August 1810. Commander Urry Johnson assumed command.

On 27 April 1811 Avenger captured the American vessel Vigilant.

Avenger sailed for Newfoundland on 26 March 1811 and again on 19 May 1812.

On 18 June 1812 Avenger captured an unnamed brig.

On 14 July Avenger captured the American ship Arab.

Lloyd's List reported in October 1812 that Avenger had captured Adeline, sailing from London to Bath, Maine, but that the  had recaptured Adeline and sent her into the United States. Avenger had captured Adeline on 7 August and Constitution had recaptured her on 15 August.

Also in October Lloyd's List reported that Avenger had detained and sent into Newfoundland two vessels, Gleaner, which had been sailing from Lisbon for Boston, and Adriatic, which had been sailing from Corunna to New York. Gleaner was captured on 25 July.

Fate
Avenger sailed from St Johns, Newfoundland on 6 October 1812, but bad weather led Commander Johnson to attempt to return in the evening of 8 October. Wind drove her aground in the narrows and she was unable to get off despite attempts to lighten her and use kedge anchors. The wind and waves pounded her, opening leaks. Although the crew manned the pumps throughout the night the water rose. In the morning boats came out from St Johns and were able to rescue the entire crew by 9a.m.

Notes, citations, and references
Notes

Citations

References
 
 

 

1803 ships
Age of Sail merchant ships of England
Sloops of the Royal Navy
Maritime incidents in 1812